Kazushi (written: 和志, 和司, 和士, 和史, 一志 or 一至) is a masculine Japanese given name. Notable people with the name include:

, Japanese manga artist
, Japanese rugby sevens player
, Japanese writer
, Japanese footballer
, Japanese footballer and manager
, Japanese footballer
, Japanese professional wrestler
, Japanese conductor
, Japanese mixed martial artist and professional wrestler
, Japanese footballer
, Japanese badminton player

Japanese masculine given names